1946 Academy Awards may refer to:

 18th Academy Awards, the Academy Awards ceremony that took place in 1946
 19th Academy Awards, the 1947 ceremony honoring the best in film for 1946